The Chile men's national pitch and putt team represents Chile in the pitch and putt international competitions. It is managed by the Federación Chilena de Pitch and Putt (FCPP), one of the founders of the Federation of International Pitch and Putt Associations (FIPPA).

Chile reached the 5th place in the 2008 Pitch and putt World Cup.

National team

Players
National team in the World Cup 2008
 Fernando Valenzuela
 Guillermo Aranciba
 Daniel Valenzuela

National team in the World Cup 2006
Max Valenzuela
Guillermo Arancibia
Juan Morán

See also
World Cup Team Championship

External links
FIPPA Federation of International Pitch and Putt Associations website

National pitch and putt teams
Pitch and putt